Nataliya Zolotukhina (born 24 November 1976) is a Ukrainian butterfly swimmer. She competed in two events at the 1996 Summer Olympics.

References

External links
 

1976 births
Living people
Ukrainian female butterfly swimmers
Olympic swimmers of Ukraine
Swimmers at the 1996 Summer Olympics
Place of birth missing (living people)